The Sudan (singular Al Suwaidi ) is an Arab tribe of Qahtanite origin in Qatar and the United Arab Emirates (UAE), and other Gulf states.

The settled Sudan at the turn of the 20th century numbered some 405 houses in Abu Dhabi and Batin, 250 houses in Dubai, 300 in Sharjah and 12 in Ajman. The family also settled the islands of the Persian Gulf, with some 20 houses on Abu Musa and 40 families living on Sirri Island. Some 5,000 strong, the tribe was mostly settled in the coastal areas of the Trucial States.

The Sudan mostly subsisted on fishing and pearling and did not own date gardens in the inland oases.

The Sudan in Qatar 
The Sudan played an important part in the founding of Bida’a on Qatar’s eastern coast. The oldest quarter of the town was settled by members of the tribe from Abu Dhabi and Oman in 1766. In 1801 the British representative in Muscat, David Seton, suspected the tribe of being involved in piracy and sailed with the sultan of Oman in order to bombard Bida’a, but the waters were too shallow to allow his gunboat to come within range. 

In February 1841, after the Sudan were suspected of harbouring the pirate Jasim bin Jabir (known as Raqraqi) in Bida'a, a British squadron arrived to punish the headman, Salimayn bin Nasir al-Suwaidi. Upon a few warning shots being fired at the town, Salimayn paid a fine in cash and jewellery, and handed over Raqraqi's ship, which was set alight. In May 1843 Isa bin Tarif, head of the Al Bin Ali tribe and former sheikh of Huwailah, moved to Bida'a and forced the near-bankrupt Sudan to leave Bida'a and settle in Lingah.

The northern Sudan of Qatar were an influential group until their power declined in 1867 after a Bahraini attack on Doha and Bida'a. They continued to make a living in the pearling trade and through seafaring. In the 1890s, however, relations with the sheikh of Doha Jassim bin Mohammed Al Thani were tense and a move to the island of Al Zorah on the Trucial Coast was contemplated (see below). When that scheme failed they remained in Bida’a, which eventually merged with Doha. In 1915 the tribe had 80 out of 150 houses in the town, and they were exempt from pearling taxes.

Association with Bani Yas 
In Abu Dhabi, the Sudan are closely associated with the Bani Yas and Sheikh Zayed bin Khalifa Al Nahyan's mother was a Suwaidi. He married the daughter of the Sheikh of the Sudan, Sultan bin Nasir Al Suwaidi. It was with the Sudan that Zayed conceived the idea of establishing a fort at Al Zorah in Ajman, in order to consolidate and build a bridgehead into the northern emirates. In 1897, a section of the Sudan under Sultan bin Nasser requested permission to settle Al Zorah with the support of Zayed, which was granted by the British Resident.

Alarmed by the scheme, the Ruler of Ajman built a fort at one of the waterways connecting Al Zorah with the mainland (it was at the time an island) and the Ruler of Sharjah, Sheikh Saqr bin Khalid Al Qasimi, in 1890, appealed to the Resident to prevent this establishment of a non-Al Qasimi stronghold in the midst of his territory. This being upheld, to the annoyance of Zayed who had seen Al Zorah as an extension of his claim to the Northern coast, the scheme was abandoned and the decision to block it was subsequently upheld after a visit to Al Zorah by Major Percy Cox, the British Political Resident.

The Sudan often played a key role in Abu Dhabi political affairs, with Sheikh Ahmad bin Khalifah Al Suwaidi leading the opposition to Shakhbut bin Sultan as Ruler, when this was proposed to the family and leading notables, supporting Hazza bin Sultan instead.

In 1829, the area of Deira, the opposite side to the creek to Dubai, was settled by some 400 Sudan who had left Sharjah in 1826 following an argument with the Ruler, Sheikh Sultan bin Saqr Al Qasimi.

See also
As-Suwaidi (disambiguation)

References 

Tribes of the United Arab Emirates